Colin Arthur Fitzgerald Campbell (17 June 1863 – 6 January 1916) was the inaugural Archdeacon of Wisbech.
 
Campbell was the tenth child, and sixth son, of Colonel Sir Edward Campbell, 2nd Baronet and Georgiana Charlotte Theophila, 2nd daughter of Sir Theophilus Metcalfe, 4th Bt. He was educated at Tonbridge School and Clare College, Cambridge. He was a teacher at Spondon School from 1885 to 1889; and Private Secretary to the Governor of South Australia, the Earl of Kintore from 1889 to 1892. He was ordained deacon in 1893 and priest in 1894. After a curacy in  Hartlebury he was: Senior Domestic Chaplain  to the Archbishop of Canterbury from 1884 to 1886; Private Chaplain to the Lieutenant Governor of the Isle of Man from 1886 to 1893; Rector of Thornham Magna cum Parva from 1895 to 1902; Rector of Street, Somerset from 1902 to 1908; Rector of Worlingworth from 1908–12 (and Rural Dean of Hoxne from 1909 to 1912; and Rector of Feltwell from 1912 until his death.

Notes

1863 births
People educated at Tonbridge School
Alumni of Clare College, Cambridge
Archdeacons of Wisbech
1916 deaths